Werewolves on Wheels is a 1971 American exploitation film directed by Michel Levesque and starring Stephen Oliver, D.J. Anderson, and Deuce Barry. It blends two genres: the outlaw biker film and the traditional horror film.

Plot
"As it is, the story takes up the tracks of a California biker gang, the Devil's Advocates, as they speed across a barren highway on a drug-infused journey of undisclosed intent. Losing their way, they stop for the night on the grounds of a 'church' tucked away in some hills off the beaten path. Much to their initial pleasure, they are fed by a kindly group of hooded priests before settling into a deep, inebriated stupor."

As a group of bikers moves across the desert, they come across an old church that a Satanic cult has taken over. The cultists give them drugged food and the bikers soon fall asleep. That night the cultists cast a curse on the biker leader's girlfriend that makes her turn into a werewolf after nightfall; she soon infects her boyfriend. The bikers leave the church and begin to be killed off whenever they stop for the night. Things come to a climax when the couple changes in front of the bikers, who quickly kill the beasts. The bikers return to the church to have their revenge, but stop when they see themselves in the cult-procession.

Cast
 Stephen Oliver as Adam
 Donna Anders as Helen (as D.J. Anderson)
 Deuce Barry as Tarot
 William Gray as Pill
 Gray Johnson as Movie
 Barry McGuire as Scarf
 Owen Orr as Mouse
 Anna Lynn Brown as Shirley
 Severn Darden as One

Production
In many scenes, footage was used of real bikers with no experience or training in acting going about their lives as normal. Thus, parts of this film could be regarded as an early experiment in reality as entertainment.

References

External links
 
 

1971 films
1971 horror films
1970s action films
1971 independent films
American action horror films
American exploitation films
American supernatural horror films
American independent films
Films about drugs
Outlaw biker films
American werewolf films
Films about Satanism
1970s English-language films
1970s American films